Ilha Rasa Lighthouse is an active lighthouse on the namesake island located   from  Guanabara Bay, Rio de Janeiro, Brazil.

History
Before the construction of the lighthouse a fire was lit every night on the summit of Ilha Rasa signalling the entrance to the Port of Rio de Janeiro. João VI decided the construction of the lighthouse on the island and the works began in 1819 employing prisoners as workforce under the supervision of the engineer João de Souza Pacheco Leitão. The tower was completed in 1825, but its inauguration was postponed as the Argentine pirates attacked the ship transporting the optical instruments from France where they were  built.

The lighthouse was lit on July 31, 1829; it is a 3-storey square prism stone building surmounted by a cylindrical tower with balcony and lantern. The lantern was equipped with first-order rotary catoptrics system and three parabolic reflectors lit by 21 lamps burning rapeseed oil. On December 2, 1883, was inaugurated a new 1st-order Doppler lens, manufactured by Lepaute et Sautter & Lemonnier and installed by engineer Louis Belenot.

The lantern is currently equipped with one of the two mesoradial lenses built in 1909. Since 1951 the lighthouse operate with electric power supplied by diesel engines. The lighthouse is managed by the Brazilian Navy and is identified by the country code number BR-2420.

See also
List of lighthouses in Brazil

References

External links

  Centro de Sinalização Náutica Almirante Moraes Rego

Lighthouses in Brazil